This is a list of science fiction thriller films.


0–9 
 The 5th Wave
 10 Cloverfield Lane
 2012 (2009)
 24 (2016)

A 
 Air
 Alien Hunter
 Aliens
 The Andromeda Strain
 The Astronaut's Wife

B 
 Bombshell
 A Boy and His Dog
 The Butterfly Effect 2
 The Butterfly Effect 3: Revelations
 The Butterfly Effect

C 
 Captain America: Civil War
 Cell
 Chain Reaction
 Children of Men
 Chronicle
 The Cloverfield Paradox
 Colossus: The Forbin Project
 Coma
 Cypher

D 
 The Darkest Hour
 The Day of the Dolphin
 Déjà Vu
 District 9
 Doom
 Doomwatch
 Doppelgänger

E 
 Ex Machina

F 
 Final Fantasy VII: Advent Children
 The Final Programme
 Firestarter
 Frequency
 Friend of the World

G 
 Ghost in the Shell
 Geostorm
 Gravity

H 
 The Host
 The Hunger Games
 The Hunger Games: Catching Fire
 The Hunger Games: Mockingjay – Part 1
 The Hunger Games: Mockingjay – Part 2

I 
 In Time
 Inception
 Infected (2008)
 The Invasion
 Interstellar

J 
 Jurassic Park

K 
 The Kindred (1987)
 Kingsglaive: Final Fantasy XV (2016)
 Knowing (2009)

L 
 Life
 The Lobster
 Looper

M 
 Marooned (1969)
 The Matrix (1999)
The Matrix Reloaded (2003)
 The Matrix Revolutions (2003)
 The Matrix Resurrections (2021)
 The Maze Runner (2014)
 Maze Runner: The Scorch Trials (2015)
 Maze Runner: The Death Cure (2018)
 Megaville (1990)
 Minority Report (2002)
 Monolith (2022)

O 
 Okja (2017)
 OtherLife (2017)

P 
 Pandemic
 Pitch Black
 Project Almanac
 Project X (1987)

R 
 Race to Witch Mountain
 Red Planet
 RoboCop (2014)

S 
 S. Darko (2009)
 The Signal (2014)
 Signs (2002)
 Silent Warnings (2003)
 Skyline (2010)
 Songbird (2020)
 A Sound of Thunder (2005)
 Source Code (2011)
 Southbound (2015)
 Storm (1999)
 Super 8 (2011)

T 
 Terminator 2: Judgment Day
 Terminator 3: Rise of the Machines
 The Terminator
 The Thirteenth Floor
 They Crawl
 Time Renegades
 Time Teens
 Timing

V 
 Vanilla Sky
 Venom (2014)

W 
 Westworld
 WXIII: Patlabor the Movie 3

X 
 XChange (2000)

References

See also 
 List of comic science fiction films
 List of science fiction films
 Lists of thriller films
 List of science fiction horror films
 List of science fiction action films

Science fiction thriller films